Núria Picas (born 2 November 1976) is a Spanish female sky runner and trail runner, who won title at the 2012 Skyrunner World Series in SkyUltra.

Selected results

References

External links
 Núria Picas profile at ITRA
 Official site

1976 births
Living people
Spanish sky runners
Trail runners